The 1922 All-Pro Team consists of American football players chosen by various selectors as the best players at their positions for the All-Pro team of the National Football League (NFL) for the 1922 NFL season.  Teams were selected by the Canton Daily News (CDN) and by George Halas (GH). Halas selected a first team and a second team.

Team

References

All-Pro Teams
1922 National Football League season